The Man in the Mask is a 2015 South Korean television drama series starring Joo Sang-wook and Kim Sun-a. It aired on KBS2 from May 20 to July 9, 2015 on Wednesdays and Thursdays at 21:55 for 16 episodes.

Plot
Ha Dae-chul (Joo Sang-wook) who has double identity. He's a normal prosecutor during the day and a masked vigilante at night to punish those that the law could not. Meanwhile, Yoo Min-hee (Kim Sun-a) is a female detective in charge of the violent crime division.

Cast
Joo Sang-wook as Ha Dae-chul
Noh Young-hak as young Ha Dae-chul
Kim Sun-a as Yoo Min-hee
Um Ki-joon as Kang Hyun-woong
Jun Kwang-ryul as Jo Sang-taek
Hwang Sun-hee as Seo Ri-na
Yoo Se-hyung as Moon Tae-seong	
Park Yeong-gyu as Jung Do-sung
Lee Moon-sik as Jang Ho-sik
Park Young-ji as Seo Min-sung
Lee Won-jong as Ji Dong-chan
Kim Byung-choon as Park Dong-pyo
Hong Seok-cheon as Pi Sung-ho
Lee Ki-young as Kang Joong-ho
Jung Ae-ri as Im Ji-sook
Myung Gye-nam as Song Man-seok
Park Jung-hak as Lee Jang-kwon
Kim Dae-ryung as Ki-ho
Choi Sung-jae as Ki-tae

Ratings 
The series initially aired, two weeks after initial broadcast, on KBS World with subtitles. This was later reduced to one week.

International broadcast
 It aired in Vietnam from November 11, 2016 on HTV2.

References

External links
  
 
 
 

2015 South Korean television series debuts
2015 South Korean television series endings
Korean Broadcasting System television dramas
Television series about prosecutors
South Korean romantic comedy television series
South Korean action television series
Television series by Kim Jong-hak Production